P, or p, is the sixteenth letter of the Latin alphabet, used in the modern English alphabet, the alphabets of other western European languages and others worldwide. Its name in English is pee (pronounced ), plural pees.

History
The Semitic Pê (mouth), as well as the Greek Π or π (Pi), and the Etruscan and Latin letters that developed from the former alphabet, all symbolized , a voiceless bilabial plosive.

Use in writing systems

In English orthography and most other European languages,  represents the sound .

In German, the digraph  is common, representing a labial affricate .

However, native English words with non-initial  are quite common; such words can come from either Kluge's law or the consonant cluster  (PIE *p has been preserved after s).

In the International Phonetic Alphabet,  is used to represent the voiceless bilabial plosive.

Music
A bold italic letter  is used in musical notation as a dynamic indicator for "quiet". It stands for the Italian word piano.

Related characters

Ancestors, descendants and siblings
The Latin letter P represents the same sound as the Greek letter Pi, but it looks like the Greek letter Rho.
𐤐 : Semitic letter Pe, from which the following symbols originally derive
Π π : Greek letter Pi
𐌐 : Old Italic and Old Latin P, which derives from Greek Pi, and is the ancestor of modern Latin P. The Roman P had this form (𐌐) on coins and inscriptions until the reign of Claudius,  (see also Claudian letters).
 : Gothic letter pertra/pairþa, which derives from Greek Pi
П п : Cyrillic letter Pe, which also derives from Pi
 : Coptic letter Pi
Պ պ: Armenian letter Pe
P with diacritics: Ṕ ṕ Ṗ ṗ Ᵽ ᵽ Ƥ ƥ ᵱ ᶈ
Uralic Phonetic Alphabet-specific symbols related to P:

p : Subscript small p was used in the Uralic Phonetic Alphabet prior to its formal standardization in 1902

Derived ligatures, abbreviations, signs and symbols
₱ : Philippine peso sign
℘ : script letter P, see Weierstrass p
℗ : sound recording copyright symbol
♇ : Pluto symbol
ꟼ : Reversed P was used in ancient Roman texts to stand for puella (girl)
Ꝑ ꝑ, Ꝓ ꝓ, Ꝕ, ꝕ : Various forms of P were used for medieval scribal abbreviations

Computing codes

Other representations

See also
 Mind your Ps and Qs
 Pence or "penny," the English slang for which is p (e.g. "20p" = 20 pence)

References

External links

ISO basic Latin letters